This is a list of World Music Network's "Rough Guide" albums. Most of the titles in the series begin with the phrase "The Rough Guide to" or "The Rough Guide to the Music of", and so these phrases are not shown in the titles listed below; those lacking such phrases (typically benefit or compilation albums) are still designated as part of the series by their catalogue number prefix, "RGNET".

References

 
Lists of albums